Connectionist temporal classification (CTC) is a type of neural network output and associated scoring function, for training recurrent neural networks (RNNs) such as LSTM networks to tackle sequence problems where the timing is variable. It can be used for tasks like on-line handwriting recognition or recognizing phonemes in speech audio. CTC refers to the outputs and scoring, and is independent of the underlying neural network structure. It was introduced in 2006.

The input is a sequence of observations, and the outputs are a sequence of labels, which can include blank outputs. The difficulty of training comes from there being many more observations than there are labels. For example in speech audio there can be multiple time slices which correspond to a single phoneme. Since we don't know the alignment of the observed sequence with the target labels we predict a probability distribution at each time step. A CTC network has a continuous output (e.g. softmax), which is fitted through training to model the probability of a label. CTC does not attempt to learn boundaries and timings: Label sequences are considered equivalent if they differ only in alignment, ignoring blanks. Equivalent label sequences can occur in many ways – which makes scoring a non-trivial task, but there is an efficient forward–backward algorithm for that.

CTC scores can then be used with the back-propagation algorithm to update the neural network weights.

Alternative approaches to a CTC-fitted neural network include a hidden Markov model (HMM).

References

Artificial neural networks